Yukhym Hryhorovych Medvedev (1 April 1886 – 7 June 1938) was a Ukrainian Soviet politician and the first elected chairman of the Soviet parliament in Ukraine. Medvedev was a member of various Communist parties, but in early 1930s quit his political life and committed himself to a civilian life. In January 1938 he was arrested by the State Security police and later that year shot on the grounds of being an anti-Soviet terrorist. In 1957 Medvedev was rehabilitated posthumously.

Biography
Medvedev was born in Bakhmut city of Yekaterinoslav Governorate in a family of Ukrainian ethnicity. After finishing the Bakhmut Technological College he worked as an electrical technician at factories of Bakhmut and Yekaterinoslav. In 1904 Medvedev enrolled into the Russian Social Democratic Labour Party (RSDLP), but in 1917 he became a member of the Ukrainian Social Democratic Labour Party. The same year he initiated the organization of the Kharkiv Ukrainian left social-democrats which cooperated with the Bolsheviks. In December 1917 Medvedev became one of the organizers of the 1st All-Ukrainian Congress of Soviets of Peasants', Workers', and Soldiers' Deputies in Kharkiv. The congress formed the All-Ukrainian Central Executive Committee, the chairman of which Medvedev was elected on December 24, 1917. The committee supported the Bolsheviks' intentions on the liquidation of the government of the Ukrainian People's Republic. In January–February 1918 he headed the Soviet Ukrainian delegation to the Brest's negotiations. Medvedev was dismissed as the chairman of TsVK in March 1918 and with withdrawal of the Soviet forces from Ukraine moved to Moscow. There he was a member of the Bureau of Ukrainian left social-democrats in exile. After the Russian aggression on Ukraine in August 1919 Medvedev joined Borotbists, however already in July 1920 the party has self-liquidated at its 4th Party Congress and most of its members joined the ranks of the Communist Party (Bolsheviks) of Ukraine. At the start of 1930s Medevedev has fully quit the political life and lived in the capital city of Kharkiv where he worked at numerous locations. On 27 January 1938 he was arrested for alleged membership of a military-terrorist organization and anti-Soviet activity. He was sentenced to death on 11 May and shot on 7 June 1938. Posthumously rehabilitated on 22 November 1957.

References

Bibliography
Fedorovsky, Yu. Our countryman - the first Soviet president. "Bratia-slavyane" #16. May 2010.

External links
 Handbook of history of Ukraine
Handbook on history of the Communist Party and the Soviet Union

1886 births
1938 deaths
People from Bakhmut
People from Bakhmutsky Uyezd
Mensheviks
Ukrainian Social Democratic Labour Party politicians
Borotbists
Bolsheviks
Communist Party of Ukraine (Soviet Union) politicians
Chairmen of the All-Ukrainian Central Executive Committee
Great Purge victims from Ukraine
Soviet rehabilitations